Richard Douglas Hurst (born January 1, 1946) is an American actor who portrayed Deputy Cletus Hogg, Boss Hogg's cousin, in the 1980 to 1983 seasons of The Dukes of Hazzard as well as The Dukes of Hazzard: Reunion! in 1997 and The Dukes of Hazzard: Hazzard in Hollywood in 2000.

He also starred as Earl, the chef in the short-lived Bea Arthur series Amanda's.

He appeared in many movies, including The Karate Kid Part III (1989) as the Announcer. He makes numerous appearances at various Dukes of Hazzard events and at Cooters in Nashville and Gatlinburg, Tennessee. He also has made appearances at The World Of Wheels in Birmingham, Alabama.

Family
His sons are actor Ryan Hurst, and Collin Hurst. He was married to Shelly Weir, the mother of Collin.

Filmography

 The Doris Day Show (TV series) as Mechanic, episode "Happiness Is Not Being Fired" (1971)
 Sanford and Son (TV series) as Police Officer, episode "The Piano Movers" (1972)
 The Partridge Family (TV series) as Deputy Haynie, episode "M is for the Many Things" (1972)
 Unholy Rollers (1972) as Mover
 The Doris Day Show (TV series) as Herb, episode "Anniversary Gift" (1972)
 To Hell You Preach (1972)
 The Bob Newhart Show (1972-1978) as Maintenance Man, episode "Motel" (1973)
 Love, American Style (TV series 1969-1974) on Season 4, Episode 14 (1973) and on Season 5, Episode 3 (1973)
 Kung Fu (TV series 1972-1975) as Tubbs, episode "The Chalice" (1973)
 Gunsmoke (TV series 1955-1975) as Mayhew, episode "Kitty's Love Affair" (1973)
 Kojak (TV series 1973-1978) Crew Cut Hostage (as Richard Hurst), episode "Siege of Terror" (1973)
 Executive Action (1973) as Used Car Salesman
 The Girl with Something Extra (TV series 1973-1974), episode "It's So Peaceful in the Country" (1973) 
 Happy Days (TV Series 1974-1984) as Cook, episode "All the Way" (1974)
 Get Christie Love! (TV Movie 1974) as Sergeant Tom Farrell
 It's Good to Be Alive (TV Movie 1974) as Ambulance Attendant
 Little House on the Prairie (TV Series) as Jacob Jacobsen, episode "100 Mile Walk" (1974)
 Paper Moon (TV Series 1974–1975), episode "The Manly Art" (1974)
 The Six Million Dollar Man (TV Series 1974–1978) as Connors, episode "The Midas Touch" (1974)
 Keep Off My Grass! (1975) as Grady Talbot
 The Blue Knight (TV Series) 1975–1976) as Detective Harriman, episode "Pilot" (1975)
 W.W. and the Dixie Dancekings (1975) as Butterball 
 Tunnel Vision (1976) as Father 
 On the Rocks (TV Series 1975–1976) as Cleaver
 M*A*S*H (TV series 1972–1983) as Capt. Schaeffer, episode "Fade Out, Fade In" (1977)
 The Legend of Frank Woods (1977) as Ace Starkey
 Baretta (TV Series 1975–1978) as Charlie, episode "Lyman P. Dokker, Fed" (1977)
 The Cat from Outer Space (1978) as Dydee Guard
 M*A*S*H (TV Series 1972–1983) as Schaeffer, episode "Our Finest Hour" (1978)
 From Here to Eternity (1979 TV Mini-Series) as Pfc. Hanson
 Supertrain (1979 TV Series) as David, episode "Where Have You Been Billy Boy" (1979)
 CHiPs (TV Series) as The Movie Director, episode "Death Watch"
 Going Ape! (1981) as Brandon
 The Dukes of Hazzard (TV Series 1979-1985) as Cletus, 47 episodes (1979-1982)
 Amanda's (1983 TV Series) as Earl Nash, 13 episodes 
 Wildside (TV Series 1984) as Floyd Fussell, episode "Don't Keep the Home Fires Burning"
 The Karate Kid (1984) as Announcer
 Highway to Heaven (TV Series 1984-1989) as Burt Morgan, episode "Birds of a Feather" (1985)
 The Last Precinct (TV Series 1986) as Albert the Ape, episode "Pilot"
 Blue City (1986) as Redneck
 Jackals (1986) as Harley
 The Karate Kid Part II (1986) as Announcer
 Starman (TV Series 1986-1987) as Charlie Ewing, episode "Blue Lights" (1986)
 Sidekicks (TV Series 1986-1987) as Berglund, episode "The Boy Who Saw Too Much" (1987)
 Earth Girls Are Easy (1988) as Joe the Cop
 Murder, She Wrote (TV Series) as Police Chief Slocum, episode "Something Borrowed, Someone Blue" (1989)
 The Karate Kid Part III (1989) as Announcer
 Worth Winning (1989) as Big Bouncin' Bob
 227 (TV Series) as Bronco Bob, episodes "How the West Was Fun: Part 1" (1989) "How the West Was Fun": Part 2 (1989)
 Steel Magnolias (1989) as Bark Boone
 Perfect Strangers (TV Series 1986-1983) as Uncle Shaggy, episode "Digging Up the News" (1990)
 The Wonder Years (TV Series 1988–1993) as Harry Detweiler, episode "Growing Up" (1990)
 Good Grief (TV Series) as Buckaroo Bob, episode "Cub Scouts and Horses & Whiskers on Kittens" (1990)
 Evening Shade (TV Series) as Nelson, episode "Something to Hold on To" (1990)
 In the Line of Fire (1993) as Bartender
 Family Matters (TV Series) as Santa, episode "Christmas Is Where the Heart Is" (1993)
 Melrose Place (TV Series) as Sydney's Client, episode "Under the Mistletoe" (1993)
 The John Larroquette Show (TV Series) as Richard, episode "In the Pink" (1995)
 The Client (TV Series) as Officer Grindle, episode "Drive, He Said" (1995)
 The Dukes of Hazzard: Reunion! (1997 TV Movie) as Deputy Cletus Hogg
 Anywhere But Here (1999) as Reverend
 Suckers (2001) as Texas Customer
 The Dukes of Hazzard: Hazzard in Hollywood (2000 TV Movie) as Deputy Cletus Hogg
 Venomous (2001) as Edgar Williams
 The Guardian (TV Series) as Frank Churchill, episode "Ambition" (2003)
 Return of the Killer Shrews (2012) as Harold Rook

References

External links

1946 births
Male actors from Houston
American male film actors
Tulane University alumni
Temple University alumni
American male television actors
Circle in the Square Theatre School alumni
Living people